In geometry, a hexagonal pyramid or hexacone is a  pyramid with a hexagonal base upon which are erected six isosceles triangular faces that meet at a point (the apex). Like any pyramid, it is self-dual.

A right hexagonal pyramid with a regular hexagon base has C6v symmetry.

A right regular pyramid is one which has a regular polygon as its base and whose apex is "above" the center of the base, so that the apex, the center of the base and any other vertex form a right triangle.

Vertex coordinates

A hexagonal pyramid of edge length 1 has the following vertices:

These coordinates are a subset of the vertices of the regular triangular tiling.

Representations

A hexagonal pyramid has the following Coxeter diagrams:

ox6oo&#x (full symmetry)
ox3ox&#x (generally a ditrigonal pyramid)

Related polyhedra

See also 
 Bipyramid, prism and antiprism

External links

Virtual Reality Polyhedra www.georgehart.com: The Encyclopedia of Polyhedra
 Conway Notation for Polyhedra Try: "Y6"
  Hexagonal pyramid - Polytope Wiki

Pyramids and bipyramids
Self-dual polyhedra
Prismatoid polyhedra